The Tower ("Tower") is a 2012 South Korean disaster thriller film about a fire that breaks out in a luxury skyscraper in central Seoul on Christmas Eve after an aviation accident involving a helicopter. The film is directed by Kim Ji-hoon, and stars Sol Kyung-gu, Son Ye-jin and Kim Sang-kyung in the lead roles. It was released in theaters on December 25, 2012.

Plot
Lee Dae-ho (Kim Sang-kyung) is a single father and manager of Tower Sky, a 120 story luxurious landmark building complex in Yeouido, Seoul. He is an earnest employee liked by his colleagues and is secretly in love with Seo Yoon-hee (Son Ye-jin), a restaurant manager. Mr. Jo, the owner of the complex, decides to hold a "White Christmas" party for tenants and VIPs on Christmas Eve, with helicopters circling above with huge lights attached below them, sprinkling snow onto the party. Dae-ho has promised to spend the day at an amusement park with his daughter Ha-na, but had to cancel as he is needed at the party. However, the building has faulty water sprinklers due to frozen pipes, but Mr. Cha, the Tower Sky'''s safety section head, is more concerned for the party than any possible architectural errors within the building, despite warnings from his fellow employers about these errors. (One example of their warnings is when cook Young-cheol (Jeon Bae-soo) accidentally leaves a stove on for too long and causes a minor fire.) Young-cheo is in love with a receptionist within the building named Min-jung, and even sneaks out of the kitchen while on duty to make her an ice cream. Meanwhile, Lee Seon-woo (Do Ji-han) is a rookie fireman entering the Yeouido Fire Station. When he gets accepted, he learns that many of the firefighters get more breaks than actual firefighting. In a prank to fool Seon-woo, the other firefighters ring the fire alarm for the squad to assemble while he takes a shower, causing him to appear in front of his entire team naked, much to the other firefighters' amusement. They take the opportunity to show their acceptance of Seon-woo as one of them, putting his helmet on his head for the first time.

While the party is in full swing, and while Young-cheo proposes a rose to Min-jung in an elevator, huge gusts of wind cause one of the helicopters to lose control and the attached lights crash into the glass bridge connecting the two Tower Sky buildings and into a side of one of the buildings. Another one of the helicopters then crashes into the building, causing the helicopter to leak fuel and the building catches fire. Shards of glass fall onto the partygoers below, which include Mr. Yoon (Song Jae-ho) and his friend Mrs. Jung (Lee Joo-shil), while another one of the huge lights falls and crashes onto a bus. At one point, while evacuating, some people, including a security guard, board an elevator despite warnings not to use it, as the security guard rejects Yoon-hee and Ha-na from entering just as they are about to board. While traveling down, an explosion occurs below the elevator, which stops it in its path. This literally fries the people inside while melting their shoes until the elevator explodes, killing everyone in it.

Dae-ho moves quickly to save Ha-na, Yoon-hee and his colleagues. At the same time, firefighters Kang Young-ki (Sol Kyung-gu) and Seon-woo fight to bring the blaze under control, helping Dae-ho in the process. Together they fight to save the lives of everyone. While Yoon-hee, Ha-na, Young-cheol, Ming-jung and the others take refuge in the building's Chinese restaurant, the firefighters decide to contain the blaze at its origin, the 63rd floor, where the helicopter crashed. Despite containing the fire on that floor, it spreads further within the building.

In the end, Young-ki sacrifices his own life to save not only Seon-woo, but for all people in the future by detonating the switch manually inside the water storage tanks to allow the current to carry the remaining survivors through the sewers and out into the Han River since he accidentally dropped the remote control switch while on his way. Meanwhile, the Mayor of Seoul orders the firefighters to detonate a bomb to demolish the building in order to prevent it from toppling over onto the other twin tower, which will result in cascade effect-structural failure of Tower Sky and decimate the portion of the island district of Yeouido, causing colossal damage and casualties. Before the credits roll, the camera points out in the air towards 63 Building, with the remains of Tower Sky seen in the background as morning rises on Christmas Day, which is now left with a single 108-story skyscraper, with Yeouido District shrouded below by a cloud of dust generated by the collapsing ruins of the Riverview Tower.

Cast

 Sol Kyung-gu – Captain Kang Young-ki
 Son Ye-jin – Seo Yoon-hee
 Kim Sang-kyung – Lee Dae-ho
 Kim In-kwon – Sergeant Oh Byung-man
 Ahn Sung-ki – Yeouido Fire Station chief
 Song Jae-ho – Mr. Yoon, the old man 
 Lee Joo-shil – Mrs. Jung, Mr. Yoon's friend
 Lee Han-wi – Mr. Kim, church elder 
 Kwon Tae-won – Jang, the Fire Commissioner
 Jeon Guk-hyang – Ae-ja
 Jung In-gi – Cha, the safety section head
 Cha In-pyo – President Jo
 Jeon Bae-soo – Young-chul, the cook
 Kim Sung-oh – In-gun
 Min Young – Nam-ok, the pregnant woman
 Park Jun-seo – aide
 Lee Joo-ha – Min-jung, the receptionist
 Do Ji-han – Lee Sun-woo, the rookie fireman 
 Jo Min-ah – Lee Ha-na, Dae-ho's daughter
 Lee Sang-hong – Yeouido fireman
 Jin Mo – Yeouido fireman
 Chu Min-ki – Yeouido fireman
 Kang Poong – Yeouido fireman
 Kwon Hyun-sang – Young-hoon
 Lee Chang-yong – command HQ specialist
 Lee Chang-joo – Jo's private secretary
 Park Chul-min – head cook
 Kim Eung-soo – Jin
 Park Jeong-hak – Jung
 Park Yong-su – Park
 Kim Soo-jin – Kang Young-ki's wife
 Nam Sang-seok – reporter in front of Tower Sky
 Kwon Young-hee – reporter in front of Tower Sky
 Lee Min-woo – reporter in front of Tower Sky

English dubbing
Captain Kang Young-ki - Buba Kachow
Lee Dae-ho - Patrick Seitz
Seo Yoon-hee - Erin Fitzgerald
Sergeant Oh Byung-man - Sean Chiplock
In-geon - Lucien Dodge
Lee Seon-woo - Johnny Yong Bosch
Lee Ha-na - Cassandra Lee
Cha - Russel Jimmies
Mr. Kim - Kyle Hebert
Mr. Yoon - Steve Mann
Young-cheol - Todd Haberkorn
Min-jung - Erika Harlacher

Production
Director Kim Ji-hoon (who previously helmed Sector 7 and May 18) was inspired by the 1974 Hollywood film The Towering Inferno, and his personal experience seeing the 63 Building in Seoul for the first time as a middle school student and imagining how it would feel to be trapped inside.

The crew built 26 different sets to create various spaces in the fictional 108-story Tower Sky such as a Chinese restaurant, elevators and a pedestrian overpass between the two blocks. For the scenes involving water on the 80th floor, actors Sol Kyung-gu and Kim Sang-kyung filmed in a water container set in Goyang City, Gyeonggi Province, without using stuntmen.

Kim worked on the film's post-production for two years. 1,700 cuts out of 3,000 were based on CGI and 500 of the CG cuts were full 3-D cut scenes. For more authenticity, live action shoots were combined with CGI, such as the shooting of a miniature in the United States with a motion control camera for the ending scene.

Box office
On its theater release on December 25, 2012, The Tower drew 431,759 admissions, the second highest opening day ticket sales in the history of Korean cinema (after The Thieves 436,628). It sold two million tickets in its first week, 3.54 million by its second week, and 4.45 million by its third week. On January 22, 2013, it became the first Korean film in 2013 to reach the five million mark.

International
The film was pre-sold by CJ Entertainment to Entertainment One in UK, Splendid in Germany, Benelux, Zylo for French-speaking territories, Horizon International in Turkey, Rainbow Entertainment in Singapore, Indonesia and Malaysia; and Jonon Source in Mongolia.The Tower'' earned  at the Hong Kong box office.

Awards and nominations

References

External links 
  
  
 
 
 

2012 films
2010s thriller films
South Korean thriller films
South Korean disaster films
Films about firefighting
South Korean Christmas films
Films set in Seoul
Films shot in Seoul
Films shot in Incheon
Films directed by Kim Ji-hoon
CJ Entertainment films
2010s Korean-language films
Films about high-rise fires
2010s South Korean films